Captain Henry Taprell Dorling (1883–1968) was a British sailor, author, and journalist who served in the Royal Navy during both World War One and World War Two, giving his marine fact and fiction a notable authenticity. His Pincher Martin, O.D. (1916) is widely referenced as the source for Pincher Martin (1956) by Nobel prizewinner William Golding. He wrote under the name Taffrail.

Naval career
Dorling was born in Berwick, the second son of Colonel Francis Dorling, and named Taprell Henry, but later changed the order of his names. He entered HMS Britannia in August 1897, his 1113 marks placing him fifty-eighth in merit among the sixty-three candidates accepted as naval cadets. By then an acting sub-lieutenant, he was in late September 1902 transferred to the seagoing training brig .

He was promoted to the rank of lieutenant on 31 December 1904, and commander on 31 December 1916. The following year he was appointed in command of the new   in her first commission.

Bibliography

Dorling wrote three types of books:
 Adult fiction
 Books about naval operations
 Juvenile fiction

The following list is drawn from the Jisc Library Hub Discover catalogue. This is an online database that collates 161 UK and Irish academic, national & specialist library catalogues. Nevertheless, this catalogue is not exhaustive, and three titles drawn from searches on Abe Books, a site for the used-book trade, are included.

Notes

References

External links
 
 
 Henry Taprell Dorling on The Dreadnought Project
 Works by Dorling in the Jisc Library Hub Discover collated catalogues.

1883 births
1968 deaths